Huntingdon, Pennsylvania is borough in and the county seat of Huntingdon County, Pennsylvania.

Other places in Pennsylvania known as Huntingdon include:

 Huntingdon County, Pennsylvania
 Huntingdon Valley, Pennsylvania, a community in Montgomery County
 East Huntingdon Township, Westmoreland County, Pennsylvania
 North Huntingdon Township, Westmoreland County, Pennsylvania
 South Huntingdon Township, Westmoreland County, Pennsylvania